The Ultimate Hits Collection is a compilation album by American pop singer Johnny Mathis that was released in 1998 by Columbia Records. In addition to offering several hit singles, the collection includes the first release of "Brazil (Aquarela do Brasil)", a song that was originally recorded for his 1986 collaboration with Henry Mancini, The Hollywood Musicals, but not included in the final track selection.



Reception

In giving a grade of A− to the compilation, Robert Christgau is especially fond of "Wonderful! Wonderful!", "It's Not for Me to Say", "Chances Are", "The Twelfth of Never", and "Wild Is the Wind", noting that "those five songs are the substance of Mathis's legend and legacy. Poised on the cusp of black and white, masculine and feminine, they projected an image of egoless tenderness, an irresistible breath of sensuality." 

In addition to receiving a five-star rating from AllMusic, this release has also been designated by the site as an Album Pick.

Track listing

Personnel

Johnny Mathis – vocals

Compilation

Didier C. Deutsch – producer
Joanna Ifrah – associate producer
Joy Gilbert – product manager
Patti Matheny – A&R coordinator
Jon Newman – packaging manager
Tom Ruff – mixing/mastering engineer
Steve Berkowitz – liner notes
Will Friedwald – liner notes
Mixed and mastered at Sony Music Studios, New York

References

1998 compilation albums
Johnny Mathis compilation albums
Columbia Records compilation albums